Los Hombres Calientes was a New Orleans–based jazz group. They are most associated with Latin jazz, especially Afro-Cuban jazz, and contemporary jazz. Their 1998 self-titled debut was praised by the New Orleans Times-Picayune. Bill Summers, Irvin Mayfield and Jason Marsalis were among the founding members.

Discography
 Los Hombres Calientes (1998)
 Los Hombres Calientes Volume 2 (1999)
 Los Hombres Calientes Volume 3: New Congo Square (2000)
 Los Hombres Calientes Volume 4: Vodou Dance (2003)
 Los Hombres Calientes Volume 5: Carnival (2005)

External links
[ All Music]
Metroactive Music

Jazz musicians from New Orleans
Latin jazz ensembles
Afro-Cuban jazz ensembles
American jazz ensembles from New Orleans